Armand Blanchonnet (23 December 1903 – 17 September 1968) was a French cyclist and Olympic Champion. He won the gold medal at the 1924 Olympic Games in Paris, in the Individual Time Trial. He also won the gold medal in the Team Road Race with the French winning team.

References

External links
 

1903 births
1968 deaths
French male cyclists
Olympic cyclists of France
Olympic gold medalists for France
Cyclists at the 1924 Summer Olympics
Sportspeople from Allier
Olympic medalists in cycling
Medalists at the 1924 Summer Olympics
Cyclists from Auvergne-Rhône-Alpes